Marian Satnoianu (born 3 April 1971) is a Romanian medley swimmer. He competed in two events at the 1992 Summer Olympics.

References

External links
 

1971 births
Living people
Romanian male medley swimmers
Olympic swimmers of Romania
Swimmers at the 1992 Summer Olympics
Place of birth missing (living people)